Alma de mi alma (Spanish for "Soul of my soul") is a Mexican 1965 telenovela. Each episode is of duration of 30 minutes. There are 34 episodes.

Gloria Marín played a villain in this telenovela.

Cast 

Gloria Marín — Beatriz 
David Reynoso 
Jacqueline Andere — Alma 
Enrique Álvarez Félix — Alfredo
Anita Blanch
Fanny Schiller
Elizabeth Dupeyrón
Carlos Amador Jr.
Manolo Calvo

References 

1965 telenovelas
Mexican telenovelas
Televisa telenovelas
1965 Mexican television series debuts
1965 Mexican television series endings
Spanish-language telenovelas